Panagia Kanala (Greek: Παναγιά Κανάλα) refers to an Eastern Orthodox icon of the Virgin Mary and the Sanctuary under the same name hosting the icon, in Kanala, on the Greek island of Kythnos.

The icon 

The icon depicting the Virgin Mary holding Jesus to her right side and leaning her head slightly towards him, is an example of post-Byzantine art and is considered to be the work of the hagiographer Emmanuel Skordilis. The icon measures 1m x 0.80m. In this icon, the figure of the Virgin Mary is depicted holding Christ in her arms with her left hand. To the left and right are the Archangels Gabriel and Michael.

According to the local tradition, the icon was miraculously found at night by fishermen in the waters between Kythnos and Serifos. The fishermen carried the icon to their village, Dryopida. Then, according to the same legend, the Virgin Mary appeared in the sleep of the fishermen and indicated to them the place where the church was to be built. The icon is considered as "Wonderworking".

The Church 
The icon is kept in the homonymous church in the village of Kanala in Kythnos, in the southeastern part of the island. The original church was a makeshift construction of small size. In 1869 the original building was demolished and a new one was erected in its place, which with the contribution of the residents of Dryopida evolved over time to its present form, with the most significant changes to the site taking place after 1946. In 1973 the church of Panagia Kanala was recognized as a Holy Pilgrimage by decree of the Holy Synod of the Church of Greece. The courtyard of the church is decorated with stone arches, terraces, dry stone walls and flowers and has a cobbled square.

The celebration 
Panagia Kanala is the patron saint of Kythnos and is considered as one of the most important places of pilgrimage in the Cyclades. She is celebrated every 15th of August and from the 1st of August every afternoon, the sequence of the invocation canon or paraklisi is conducted, until the 13th of August, when the Vigil ("overnight vigil") is chanted in her honor. On the eve of the celebration, the Great Vespers are chanted, followed by a great festival in the village with traditional music and dancing.

The festivities culminate on the day of the celebration, when the liturgy is celebrated, followed by a procession of the icon of the Virgin Mary through the village. The procession ends at the pier where there is a re-enactment of the finding of the icon of the Virgin Mary.  Another festival in honor of the Virgin Mary is held on September 8th , accompanied by a traditional feast.

References

Bibliography 
 Konstantinos Gonidis, ''Παναγία Κανάλα'', Έκδοσις Ομώνυμου Ιερού Προσκυνήματος, Kythnos 1998
 Giorgis Venetoulias, Του νησιού μου, Παραδόσεις της Κύθνου, En Plo, Athens 2018.

Eastern Orthodox church buildings in Greece
Kythnos
Churches in Greece
Shrines to the Virgin Mary
Eastern Orthodox icons of the Virgin Mary